Castelnau-d'Auzan-Labarrère is a commune in the Gers department of southwestern France. The municipality was established on 1 January 2016 and consists of the former communes of Castelnau-d'Auzan and Labarrère.

Geography

Population 

The population data given in the table and graph below for 2012 and earlier refer to the former communes of Castelnau-d'Auzan and Labarrère combined.

See also 
Communes of the Gers department

References 

Communes of Gers
Populated places established in 2016